The economy of Cambodia currently follows an open market system (market economy) and has seen rapid economic progress in the last decade. Cambodia had a GDP of $24.57 billion in 2018. Per capita income, although rapidly increasing, is low compared with most neighboring countries. Cambodia's two largest industries are textiles and tourism, while agricultural activities remain the main source of income for many Cambodians living in rural areas.  The service sector is heavily concentrated on trading activities and catering-related services. Recently, Cambodia has reported that oil and natural gas reserves have been found off-shore.

In 1995, with a GDP of $2.92 billion the government transformed the country's economic system from a planned economy to its present market-driven system.  Following those changes, growth was estimated at a value of 7% while inflation dropped from 26% in 1994 to only 6% in 1995. Imports increased due to the influx of foreign aid, and exports, particularly from the country's garment industry, also increased. Although there was a constant economic growth, this growth translated to only about
0.71% for the ASEAN economy in 2016, compared with her neighbor Indonesia, which contributed 37.62%.

After four years of improving economic performance, Cambodia's economy slowed in 1997–1998 due to the regional economic crisis, civil unrest, and political infighting. Foreign investments declined during this period. Also, in 1998 the main harvest was hit by drought. But in 1999, the first full year of relative peace in 30 years, progress was made on economic reforms and growth resumed at 4%.

Currently, Cambodia's foreign policy focuses on establishing friendly borders with its neighbors (such as Thailand and Vietnam), as well as integrating itself into regional (ASEAN) and global (WTO) trading systems. Some of the obstacles faced by this emerging economy are the need for a better education system and the lack of a skilled workforce; particularly in the poverty-ridden countryside, which struggles with inadequate basic infrastructure. Nonetheless, Cambodia continues to attract investors because of its low wages, plentiful labor, proximity to Asian raw materials, and favorable tax treatment.

Recent economic history

Following its independence from France in 1953, the Cambodian state has undergone five periods of political, social, and economic transformation:
 First Kingdom of Cambodia (1953-1970)
 Khmer Republic (1970–1975)
 Democratic Kampuchea (1975-1982, ousted in 1979); became Coalition Government of Democratic Kampuchea in exile (1982-1993)
 People's Republic of Kampuchea (1979-1989), later renamed "State of Cambodia" (1989–1993) 
 Second Kingdom of Cambodia (1993–present)

In 1989, the State of Cambodia implemented reform policies that transformed the Cambodian economic system from a command economy to an open market one. In line with the economic reformation, private property rights were introduced and state-owned enterprises were privatized. Cambodia also focused on integrating itself into regional and international economic blocs, such as the Association of South East Asian Nations and the World Trade Organization respectively. These policies triggered a growth in the economy, with its national GDP growing at an average of 6.1% before a period of domestic unrest and regional economic instability in 1997 (1997 Asian financial crisis). However, conditions improved and since 1999, the Cambodian economy has continued to grow at an average pace of approximately 6-8% per annum.

In 2007, Cambodia's gross domestic product grew by an estimated 18.6%. Garment exports rose by almost 8%, while tourist arrivals increased by nearly 35%. With exports decreasing, the 2007 GDP growth was driven largely by consumption and investment. Foreign direct investment (FDI) inflows reached US$600 million (7 percent of GDP), slightly more than what the country received in official aid. Domestic investment, driven largely by the private sector, accounted for 23.4 percent of GDP. Export growth, especially to the US, began to slow in late 2007 accompanied by stiffer competition from Vietnam and emerging risks (a slowdown in the US economy and lifting of safeguards on China's exports). US companies were the fifth largest investors in Cambodia, with more than $1.2 billion in investments over the period 1997-2007.

Cambodia was severely damaged by the financial crisis of 2007–2008, and its main economic sector, the garment industry, suffered a 23% drop in exports to the United States and Europe. As a result, 60,000 workers were laid off. However, in the last quarter of 2009 and early 2010, conditions were beginning to improve and the Cambodian economy began to recover. Cambodian exports to the US for the first 11 months of 2012 reached $2.49 billion, a 1 per cent increase year-on-year. Its imports of US goods grew 26 per cent for that period, reaching $213 million. Another factor underscoring the potential of the Cambodian economy is the recent halving of its poverty rate. The poverty rate is 20.5 per cent, meaning that approximately 2.8 million people live below the poverty line.

Data 
The following table shows the main economic indicators in 1986–2020 (with IMF staff estimates in 2021–2026). Inflation below 5% is in green. The annual unemployment rate is extracted from the World Bank, although the International Monetary Fund find them unreliable.

Economic sectors

Garment industry 
The garment industry represents the largest portion of Cambodia's manufacturing sector, accounting for 80% of the country's exports. In 2012, the exports grew to $4.61 billion up 8% over 2011. In the first half of 2013, the garment industry reported exports worth $1.56 billion. The sector employs 335,400 workers, of which 91% are female.

The sector operates largely on the final phase of garment production, that is turning yarns and fabrics into garments, as the country lacks a strong textile manufacturing base. In 2005, there were fears that the end of the Multi Fibre Arrangement would threaten Cambodia's garment industry; exposing it to stiff competition with China's strong manufacturing capabilities. On the contrary, Cambodia's garment industry at present continues to grow rapidly. This is can be attributed to the country's open economic policy which has drawn in large amounts of foreign investment into this sector of the economy.

Garment Factories by Ownership Nationality in 2010:

In 2010, 236 garment export-oriented factories were operating and registered with GMAC, the Garment Manufacturers Association in Cambodia, with 93% being foreign direct investment (FDI).

As seen in the table above, Cambodia's garment industry is characterized by a small percentage of local ownership. This is a reflection of the deficiency of skilled workers in the country as well as the limited leverage and autonomy Cambodian factories have in strategic decisions. Another characteristic of the industry is the country's competitive advantage as the only country where garment factories are monitored and reported according to national and international standards.

This has allowed Cambodia to secure its share of quotas for exports to the US through the US-Cambodia Trade Agreement on Textiles and Apparel (1999–2004), which linked market access to labor standards. However, the Cambodian garment industry remains vulnerable to global competition due to a lack of adequate infrastructure, labor unrest, the absence of a domestic textile industry, and almost complete dependence on imported textile material.

GMAC is establishing a specialized training institute to train garment workers. The institute is in Phnom Penh Special Economic Zone and will be completed by late 2016. It aims to train 1,600 garment workers in the first three years and 240 university students each year as part of a separate program.

Agriculture 

Agriculture is the traditional mainstay of the Cambodian economy. Agriculture accounted for 90 percent of GDP in 1985 and employed approximately 80 percent of the work force. Rice is the principal commodity.

Major secondary crops include maize, cassava, sweet potatoes, groundnuts, soybeans, sesame seeds, dry beans, and rubber. The principal commercial crop is rubber. In the 1980s it was an important primary commodity, second only to rice, and one of the country's few sources of foreign exchange.

Tourism 

In the 1960s, Cambodia was a prominent tourist destination in the Southeast Asian region. Due to protracted periods of civil war, insurgencies, and especially the genocidal regime of the Khmer Rouge (see Khmer Rouge Genocide), Cambodia's tourism industry was reduced to being virtually non-existent. Since the late 1990s, tourism is fast becoming Cambodia's second largest industry, just behind the garment manufacturing. In 2006, Cambodia's tourism sector generated a revenue of US$1.594 billion, which made up approximately 16% of the country's GDP.

Cultural heritage tourism is especially popular in the country, with many foreign tourists visiting the ancient Hindu temple of Angkor Wat located in the Siem Reap province. Other popular tourist attractions include the Royal Palace, Phnom Penh, as well as ecotourism spots such as Tonlé Sap Lake and the Mekong River.

The tourism industry in Cambodia has been perpetuated by the development of important transportation infrastructure; in particular Cambodia's two international airports in Phnom Penh and Siem Reap respectively. To the Cambodian economy, tourism has been a means for accumulation of foreign currency earnings and employment for the Cambodian workforce, with about 250,000 jobs generated in 2006. Meanwhile, challenges to the industry include a leakage of revenue to foreign markets due to a dependence on foreign goods as well as the prevalence of the Child sex tourism industry.

Gambling industry

Construction 
The increase in tourist arrivals has led to growing demand for hotels and other forms of accommodation surrounding tourist hotspots. Siem Reap in particular has seen a construction boom in recent years. The capital Phnom Penh has also witnessed a growth in the construction and real estate sector. Recently, planned projects that have been on the pipeline for several years have been shelved temporarily due to a reduction in foreign investment.
From 2009, the Cambodian government has allowed foreigners to own condominiums. This has helped in attracting real estate investors from Thailand, Malaysia, Singapore and other countries.

The construction sector attracted investment of $2.1 billion in 2012 which is a 72 per cent rise compared with 2011. Construction licenses issued stood at 1,694 projects in 2012, which was 20% lower than 2011 but they were higher in value.

Resources 

Oil seeps were discovered in Cambodia as early as the 1950s by Russian and Chinese geologists. Development of the industry was delayed, however, by the Vietnam and Cambodian Civil Wars and the political uncertainty that followed. Further discoveries of oil and natural gas deposits offshore in the early 2000s led to renewed domestic and international interest in Cambodia's production possibilities. As of 2013, the US company Chevron, Japanese JOGMEC and other international companies maintained production sites both on shore and off. Chevron alone had invested over US$160 million and drilled 18 wells.

Sok Khavan, acting director general of the Cambodian National Petroleum Authority, estimated that once the contracts are finalized and legal issues resolved, the Cambodian government will receive approximately 70% of the revenues, contributing to an economy in which the GDP is projected to increase five-fold by 2030. In addition, there are 10,000 square miles offshore in the Gulf of Thailand that holds potential reserves of 12-14 trillion cubic feet of natural gas and an unspecified amount of oil. The rights to this territory are currently a subject of dispute between Cambodia and Thailand, further delaying any possible production developments. In early 2013 it was reported that the two countries were close to a deal that would allow joint production to begin.

Foreign aid

Cambodia's emerging democracy has received strong international support. Under the mandate of the United Nations Transitional Authority in Cambodia (UNTAC), $1.72 billion (1.72 G$) was spent in an effort to bring basic security, stability and democratic rule to the country. Various news and media reports suggest that since 1993 the country has been the recipient of some US$10 billion in foreign aid.

With regards to economic assistance, official donors had pledged $880 million at the Ministerial Conference on the Rehabilitation of Cambodia (MCRRC) in Tokyo in June 1992. In addition to that figure, $119 million was pledged in September 1993 at the International Committee on the Reconstruction of Cambodia (ICORC) meeting in Paris, and $643 million at the March 1994 ICORC meeting in Tokyo.

Cambodia experienced a shortfall in foreign aid in the year 2005 due to the government's failure to pass anti-corruption laws, opening up a single import/export window, increasing its spending on education, and complying with policies of good governance. In response, the government adopted the National Strategic Development Plan for 2006–10 (also known as the “Third Five-Year Plan”). The plan focused on three major areas:
 the speeding up of economic growth at an annual rate of 6-7%
 eradicating corruption
 developing public structures in favor of quality (i.e. by education, training, and healthcare) over quantity (i.e. rapid population growth)

Banking 

There are no significant barriers to bank entry. At the end of 2013, there stood 35 commercial banks of which most have majority foreign ownership. Since 2011 new banks
with offshore funding have begun to enter the market.

Telecommunications

Energy 
Cambodia has significant potential for developing renewable energy. The country, however, remains one of the few countries in the ASEAN region that has not adopted renewable energy targets. To attract more investment in renewable energy Cambodia could adopt targets, improve renewable energy governance, develop a regulatory framework, improve project bankability and facilitate market entry for international investors. Due to high vulnerability to climate change, it is recommended that Cambodia focuses on developing renewable energy away from fossil fuels as part of climate change mitigation measures.

Transport

Child labour

Trade - EBA Issues 
The announcement from February 12, 2020 was to suspend EBA ("Everything But Arms") trade preferences  between EU and Cambodia. The country has known to be the second largest beneficiary from EBA's program. The EU's preliminary conclusion sent to Cambodian government in November 12, 2019 because Cambodia failed to address serious human and labor rights concerns under Human Rights Watch.  Moreover, the issue behind ending the opposition party (CNRP) and dropping charges against the leader of CNRP violated the right to freedom of expression.

Challenges for industrial development 

Although Cambodia exports mainly garments and products from agriculture and fisheries, it is striving to diversify the economy. There is some evidence of expansion in value-added exports from a low starting point, largely thanks to the manufacture of electrical goods and telecommunications by foreign multinationals implanted in the country. Between 2008 and 2013, high-tech exports climbed from just US$3.8million to US$76.5 million.

It will be challenging for Cambodia to enhance the technological capacity of the many small and medium-sized enterprises (SMEs) active in agriculture, engineering and the natural sciences. Whereas the large foreign firms in Cambodia that are the main source of value-added exports tend to specialize in electrical machinery and telecommunications, the principal task for science and technology policy will be to facilitate spillovers in terms of skills and innovation capability from these large operators towards smaller firms and across other sectors.

There is little evidence that the Law on Patents, Utility Model Certificates and Industrial Designs (2006) has been of practical use, thus far, to any but the larger foreign firms operating in Cambodia. By 2012, 27 patent applications had been filed, all by foreigners. Of the 42 applications for industrial design received up to 2012, 40 had been filed by foreigners. Nevertheless, the law has no doubt encouraged foreign firms to introduce technological improvements to their on-shore production systems, which can only be beneficial.

Statistics

 Investment (gross fixed) 
 3% of GDP (2011 est.)
Household income or consumption by percentage share
 lowest 10%: 2.6%
 highest 10%: 23.7% (2011)
 Agriculture - products 
 rice, 
 rubber, 
 corn, 
 vegetables, 
 cashews, 
 tapioca, 
 silk
 Industries
 tourism, garments, construction, rice milling, fishing, wood and wood products, rubber, cement, gem mining, textiles
 Industrial production growth rate
 5.7% (2011 est.)
 Electricity

 Exchange rates

See also

 Special Economic Zones of Cambodia
 Cambodia and the World Bank

Sources

References

External links
 CAMBODIA INVESTMENT GUIDEBOOK 2013 (Council for the Development of Cambodia)

 
Economics in developing countries
Cambodia